Samuel Howard "Big Boy" Archer Sr. (December 23, 1870 – January 15, 1941) was an American football player and coach and educator. He served as the head football coach at Morehouse College in Atlanta, Georgia from 1905 to 1908 and again from 1912 to 1915, compiling a record of 35–2–5.

Archer was a graduate of Colgate University, where he and George L. Hayes were the first African Americans to play for the Colgate Raiders football team in 1899.

He went on to teach mathematics at Morehouse College, and served that institution in many capacities for 33 years. He was the fifth president of Morehouse from 1931 to 1937.  He died in 1941 and is buried in Atlanta's South-View Cemetery.

Head coaching record

References

External links
 

1870 births
1941 deaths
19th-century players of American football
Colgate Raiders football players
Morehouse Maroon Tigers football coaches
Morehouse College faculty
People from Chesterfield, Virginia
Players of American football from Virginia
African-American coaches of American football
African-American players of American football
American academic administrators
Heads of universities and colleges in the United States
African-American academics
Burials at South-View Cemetery
20th-century African-American people